Joseph K. Schwartzer was an American football coach. He was the head football coach at Manhattan College for two seasons, from 1928 to 1929, compiling a record of 7–8.

References

Year of birth missing
Year of death missing
American football ends
Manhattan Jaspers football coaches
NYU Violets football coaches
Syracuse Orange football players
Syracuse Orange football coaches